Chanan Singh is an Indian-American electrical engineer and professor in the Department of Electrical and Computer Engineering, Texas A&M University. He was named Irma Runyon Chair Professor and Texas A&M System Regents Professor.

Education 
Singh got his M.S. and Ph.D. in electrical engineering from the University of Saskatchewan, Canada and B.Sc. (honors) from the Punjab Engineering College, Chandigarh, India.

Career 
From 1997 to 2005 he served as the Department Head of Electrical and Computer Engineering at Texas A&M and later, from 2012 to 2015, he served as Interim Head. He has held a position as a Guest Professor at Tsinghua University, Beijing, China. He has also served as Program Director at the National Science Foundation of USA.  He is also a principal and Vice-President of Associated Power Analysts Inc. a firm that specializes in developing software and conducting reliability studies of the electric power grid. Before joining Texas A&M University he worked in the R&D Division of Ontario Ministry of Transportation and Communications on the development of innovative public transit systems.

Singh is known for his contributions to electric power system reliability evaluation, particularly in developing the theoretical foundations for frequency and duration methods, non-Markovian models, modeling of interconnected power systems, integration of renewable resources and machine learning method for reliability analysis of large power systems. He is author/co-author of four books, several book chapters, and over 400 technical articles.

Major awards and recognition 

 2018. Elected a member of the National Academy of Engineering for "advancement of theory, practice, and education in electric power system reliability"
 2010. Inaugural recipient of the Roy Billinton Power System Reliability Award from the Power & Energy Society (PES) of the Institute of Electrical and Electronics Engineers (IEEE).
 2008.  Merit Award by the PMAPS International Society for lifelong achievements.
 1998.  recipient of the 1998 Outstanding Power Engineering Educator Award given by the IEEE-PES.
 1997.  awarded a D.Sc. degree by the University of Saskatchewan, Saskatoon, SK, Canada.
 1991.  elected a Fellow of the IEEE for "contributions to theory and applications of quantitative reliability methods in electric power systems".

Major publications 

 Textbook: Electric Power Grid Reliability Evaluation: Models and Methods (Chanan Singh, Panida Jirutitijaroen and Joydeep Mitra; Wiley-IEEE Press, 2019)
 Textbook: Engineering Reliability: New Techniques and Applications (Balbir S. Dhillon and Chanan Singh; Wiley, 1981)
 Textbook: System Reliability Modelling and Evaluation (Chanan Singh and Roy Billinton; Hutchinson, 1977)

References 

University of Saskatchewan alumni
Punjab Engineering College alumni
Texas A&M University faculty
Fellow Members of the IEEE
Members of the United States National Academy of Engineering
Living people
American electrical engineers
21st-century American engineers
20th-century Indian engineers
21st-century Indian engineers
Indian expatriates in Canada
Indian emigrants to the United States
Indian electrical engineers
Year of birth missing (living people)